T Chamaeleontis (T Cha), also known as HIP 58285, is a T Tauri star located in the southern circumpolar constellation Chamaeleon. It has an apparent magnitude that ranges from 10.05 to 14.50, which is below the limit for naked eye visibility. At its current distance, T Cha's average brightness is diminished by 0.31 magnitudes due to extinction from interstellar dust. It has an average absolute magnitude of +6.55.

History
The object was first suspected to be a RW Aurigae-type star since 1949. It was categorized as a T-Tauri star in 1975. In the same year, it was suspected to be variable and the variability was confirmed in 1976.  A 1993 paper said that it might be a weak-lined YY Orionis star. T Cha might be either a  member of the young ε Chamaeleontis association or the slightly older η Chamaeleontis association. T Cha is an Orion variable that fluctuates between 10.05 and 14.5.

Physical characteristics
T Cha has a stellar classification of K0e, indicating that it is a K-type star with emission lines in its spectrum. It has 65% the mass of the Sun but the radius is highly uncertain. Estimates range from 0.65 to 4.36 times the radius of the Sun.

References

T Tauri stars
Chamaeleontis, T
Orion variables
Chamaeleon (constellation)
058285
Hypothetical planets
Emission-line stars